Stenochilidae is a family of southeast Asian araneomorph spiders that produce ecribellate silk. First described by Tamerlan Thorell in 1873, it now contains twelve described species in two genera.

Species
, the World Spider Catalog accepts the following genera and species:

Colopea Simon, 1893
Colopea laeta (Thorell, 1895) — Myanmar, Thailand
Colopea lehtineni Zheng, Marusik & Li, 2009 — China
Colopea malayana Lehtinen, 1982 — Thailand, Malaysia, Singapore
Colopea pusilla (Simon, 1893) — Philippines
Colopea romantica Lehtinen, 1982 — Bali
Colopea silvestris Lehtinen, 1982 — New Guinea
Colopea tuberculata Platnick & Shadab, 1974 — Fiji
Colopea unifoveata Lehtinen, 1982 — Borneo
Colopea virgata Lehtinen, 1982 — Thailand, Vietnam
Colopea xerophila Lehtinen, 1982 — New Guinea

Stenochilus O. P-Cambridge, 1870
 Stenochilus crocatus Simon, 1884 — Myanmar, Cambodia, Sri Lanka
 Stenochilus hobsoni O. P.-Cambridge, 1870 — India
 Stenochilus scutulatus Platnick & Shadab, 1974 — India

See also
 List of Stenochilidae species

References

 

 
Araneomorphae families